The following is a list of districts and sub-districts in Buleleng Regency. Buleleng Regency has 9 district, 19 sub-district, and 129 villages. In 2017, the population estimated 814.356 with area 1.364,73 km² and density 598 people/km².

List of districts and sub-districts in Buleleng Regency as follows:

See also 
 List of districts of Indonesia
 List of districts of Bali
 Subdivisions of Indonesia

References

External links 
  Official Website Bali Province
  Official Website Buleleng Regency
  Official Website Statistical Bureau of Buleleng Regency

Buleleng Regency
Buleleng Regency